Tula or Moskovsky Rail Terminal is a railway station in Tula, Russia. It was opened in 1867.

Gallery

References

Railway stations in Tula Oblast
Railway stations of Moscow Railway
Railway stations in the Russian Empire opened in 1867
Objects of cultural heritage of Russia of regional significance
Cultural heritage monuments in Tula Oblast